Anne Purvis (née Clarkson, born 5 March 1959) is a Scottish former athlete who specialised in the 800 metres. She won a silver medal in the 800 metres at the 1982 Commonwealth Games and finished fourth in the 800m final at the 1986 Commonwealth Games. She also won the AAAs Championship title in 1980 and 1981, and the UK Championships title in 1982 and 1986.

Career
As Anne Clarkson, she won the AAAs Championship 800m title in 1980 in 2:01.89, and 1981 in 2:03.92. In 1982, she won the UK Championship title in 2:03.6 in May. Two months later, she ran her lifetime best for the 800m with 2:00.20 on 7 July 1982 in Oslo. This narrowly missed the then Scottish record of 2:00.15 by Rosemary Stirling from 1972. Later that year, she won a silver medal in the 800m at the 1982 Commonwealth Games in Brisbane, behind another Scots-born athlete, Kirsty McDermott, who was representing Wales. She also won a bronze medal in the 4x400m relay with teammates Linsey MacDonald, Angela Bridgeman and Sandra Whittaker.

As Anne Purvis, she finished second to Shireen Bailey at the AAAs Championship 800m in 1983, and second behind Christina Boxer at the AAAs in 1985. She won her second UK Championship title in May 1986, running 2:01.63 to defeat Helen Thorpe and Lorraine Baker. In July 1986, she finished fourth in the 800m final at the Commonwealth Games in Edinburgh, behind Kirsty Wade, Diane Edwards and Lorraine Baker. She was second to Edwards at the 1987 AAA Championships.

As of 2021, Purvis ranks sixth on the Scottish all-time list for 800 m, behind Laura Muir, Jemma Reekie, Lynsey Sharp, Susan Scott and Rosemary Stirling.

Competition record

References

1959 births
Living people
Scottish female middle-distance runners
Competitors at the 1987 Summer Universiade
Commonwealth Games silver medallists for Scotland
Commonwealth Games bronze medallists for Scotland
Commonwealth Games medallists in athletics
Athletes (track and field) at the 1982 Commonwealth Games
Athletes (track and field) at the 1986 Commonwealth Games
Medallists at the 1982 Commonwealth Games